The Newport micropolitan area may refer to:

The Newport, Oregon micropolitan area, United States
The Newport, Tennessee micropolitan area, United States

See also
Newport (disambiguation)